Lee Jung-jae (born December 15, 1972) is a South Korean actor and filmmaker. Considered one of the most successful actors in South Korea, he has received various accolades, including a Primetime Emmy Award, a Screen Actors Guild Award, a Critics' Choice Television Award, six Baeksang Arts Awards, in addition to nominations for a Golden Globe Award and a Gotham Award. Aside from his acting career, Lee is also a businessman, having launched a chain of restaurants in Seoul, as well as founding several businesses including the development company Seorim C&D. He owns several of his businesses with fellow actor and close friend Jung Woo-sung.

Born in Seoul, Lee debuted as a fashion model, then began his acting career on television, notably in the campus series Feelings (1994) and the drama Sandglass (1995). After his acting breakthrough in An Affair (1998), Lee's film career took off. He has starred in a variety of film genres, among them romantic films such as Il Mare (2000) and Over the Rainbow (2002), the Dogme 95 film Interview (2000), the melodrama Last Present (2001), well-known comedies such as Oh! Brothers (2003), action films The Last Witness (2001) and Typhoon (2005), heist film The Thieves (2012), crime thriller New World (2013), and period film The Face Reader (2013). He won Best Actor awards at the Blue Dragon Film Awards for City of the Rising Sun (1999), at the Fantasporto Director's Week for The Housemaid (2010), and at the Buil Film Awards for Assassination (2015).

In 2021, Lee gained widespread international stardom and fame for his role as Seong Gi-hun, the main protagonist of Netflix's survival drama Squid Game. For his performance, he was nominated for numerous accolades, including the Critics' Choice Television Award for Best Actor in a Drama Series, the Golden Globe Award for Best Actor – Television Series Drama, the Primetime Emmy Award for Outstanding Lead Actor in a Drama Series and the Screen Actors Guild Award for Outstanding Performance by a Male Actor in a Drama Series, making him the first male actor from Asia and Korea to receive individual nominations in those categories across all four awards shows with his win for the latter two also making history. In December 2021, he was selected as Gallup Korea's Film Actor of the Year.

Early life 
Lee Jung-jae was born on December 15, 1972, in Seoul, South Korea. He enrolled at Dongguk University, and was awarded his master's degree from the university's Department of Theater & Film Art in the Graduate School of Cultural Arts, in August 2008. He made his first foray into theater in December of that same year, taking on the titular role in Hamlet in Water. The play ran for four days at his alma mater's Lee Hae-rang Theater.

Career

1993–1997: Acting beginnings and rising popularity
Lee was discovered by designer Ha Yong-soo while he was working at a café in Apgujeong-dong (located in the Gangnam District), then worked as a fashion model for a number of years. Upon making his acting debut with the 1993 TV drama Dinosaur Teacher, Lee became a star practically overnight, and was almost always cast in lead roles thereafter. A year later, he received favorable reviews for his first big screen role in Bae Chang-ho's The Young Man, but it was the 1994 hit campus drama Feelings that made him a household name.

In 1995, what was supposed to be a small supporting role as the heroine's silent, devoted bodyguard in ratings behemoth Sandglass turned Lee into a national heartthrob, such that his screen time was increased throughout the series' run.

1998–2006: Breakout roles and mainstream popularity
Lee's acting breakthrough would come in late 1998 in the award-winning film An Affair by E J-yong. This was followed up by another success, City of the Rising Sun, for which he won Best Actor at the Blue Dragon Film Awards and the Korean Association of Film Critics Awards.Though his time-travel romance Il Mare was not a popular success in 2000, since then it has developed a loyal fan base a la Somewhere in Time and attained the status of a minor classic among Korean cinema fans (Keanu Reeves played Lee's role in the 2006 Hollywood remake The Lake House). Lee followed up with melodrama Last Present alongside Lee Young-ae and action mystery The Last Witness directed by Bae Chang-ho; both of which were considerable successes.

In 2002, Lee starred alongside Jang Jin-young in Over the Rainbow.

In 2003, he starred opposite Lee Beom-soo in Oh! Brothers, a comedy about two brothers, one of whom has an unusual disease. The film was one of Lee's biggest hits ever, topping three million admissions at the local box office. Nonetheless, he remained out of the limelight for the next couple years. Finally at the end of 2005 he returned in Typhoon, a big-budget action blockbuster by Kwak Kyung-taek, the director of Friend.

2007–2009: Career slump
Lee's much-anticipated return to television a decade after his memorable turn in Sandglass (1995) was not successful ratings-wise; Air City (2007) and Triple (2009).

With the period action comedy The Accidental Gangster and the Mistaken Courtesan, Lee said he wanted to try his hand at playing a different kind of role, a comical loose cannon type of character. Though it was not successful at the box office, he still considers it one of his most memorable films.

2010–2018: Career resurgence

Lee rejuvenated his career in the high-profile 2010 erotic thriller The Housemaid, which screened at the Cannes Film Festival, and Toronto International Film Festival. Lee nabbed a Best Actor award at the Fantasporto Director's Week. As his next project, he joined the star-studded ensemble cast of The Thieves, a 2012 heist film that became the second all-time highest-grossing movie in Korean cinema history.

El Fin del Mundo ("The End of the World") is a 13-minute split screen film made by visual artists Moon Kyung-won and Jeon Joon-ho, which depicts the destructive environmental changes the world faces in the future and the subsequent end of art and birth of new art based on dialogue between two artists in different times and space, played by Lee and Im Soo-jung. The film was screened at dOCUMENTA in 2012, considered the world's most prestigious and innovative contemporary art platform. A longtime art collector and honorary ambassador for the National Museum of Contemporary Art in 2011–2012, Lee also narrated the 2013 TV documentary Contemporary Art, Bury the Boundary which highlighted homegrown Korean artists.He played a police officer who goes undercover in a crime organization in the crime thriller New World (2013). Lee said he was grateful to co-star Choi Min-sik, who suggested casting him to the director. He later signed on to be exclusively managed by C-JeS Entertainment, reportedly choosing the agency after he worked with Song Ji-hyo in New World.
Lee then portrayed Prince Suyang opposite Song Kang-ho in the period film The Face Reader (2013), for which he won Best Supporting Actor at the Blue Dragon Film Awards and the Baeksang Arts Awards. This was followed by the action comedy Big Match in 2014, where he played a mixed martial arts fighter trying to save his brother by winning an elaborate high-stakes game.

In 2015, he reunited with The Thieves director Choi Dong-hoon and actress Jun Ji-hyun in Assassination, set in 1930s Korea and Shanghai during the Japanese occupation. Lee won a Best Actor award at the 24th Buil Film Awards and was named Actor of the Year at the 3rd Marie Claire Asia Star Awards.

Lee then starred in his first Chinese film, the crime drama Tik Tok. He returned to the Korean screen with the box office hit, Operation Chromite, playing a South Korean lieutenant in the navy, the man responsible for reversing the tide of the Korean War.

Lee's films in 2017 include the historical epic Warriors of the Dawn and the fantasy blockbuster Along With the Gods: The Two Worlds.

2019–present: Television comeback and Squid Game fame

In 2019, Lee starred in Svaha: The Sixth Finger, an occult film. The same year Lee returned to television with his first drama in a decade, the JTBC political drama Chief of Staff alongside Shin Min-a, where he plays a political advisor. In 2020, Lee starred in the action film Deliver Us from Evil alongside Hwang Jung-min and Park Jeong-min.

In September 2021, Lee starred as Seong Gi-hun, the main protagonist of Netflix's hit survival drama Squid Game. Series creator and director Hwang Dong-hyuk said he chose to cast Lee as Gi-hun as to "destroy his charismatic image portrayed in his previous roles". In the show, Gi-hun is a gambler down on his luck who gets recruited to play in a series of deadly childhood games (including "Red Light, Green Light", "Marbles", "Tug of war" and the eponymous Squid game) for a high cash prize, and ultimately becomes the winner of the game.

Due to the success of the series, Gi-hun became Lee's most famous role to date. Lee and the series received nominations at the Gotham Independent Film Awards 2021 with him individually nominated for Outstanding Performance in a New Series. Lee also received nominations for the Critics' Choice Television Award for Best Actor in a Drama Series, the Golden Globe Award for Best Actor – Television Series Drama, and the Screen Actors Guild Award for Outstanding Performance by a Male Actor in a Drama Series, making him the first male actor from Asia and Korea to receive individual nominations in those categories across all three awards shows with his win and costar HoYeon Jung winning the respective female award making history for the show becoming the first non-English language television series to win at the SAG Awards. He was also nominated along with his costars for the Screen Actors Guild Award for Outstanding Performance by an Ensemble in a Drama Series. He also won the Primetime Emmy Award for Outstanding Lead Actor in a Drama Series in 2022 for his performance in Squid Game, making him the first person to win that award for a non-English-speaking role, and the first Asian man to win that award.

On November 11, 2021, it was announced Lee was selected as a global ambassador for luxury brand Gucci. Later that month, it was announced by Squid Game creator Hwang Dong-hyuk that Lee will return as Gi-hun in the show's second season, and will "do something for the world."

In 2022, Lee made his directorial debut with the spy action film Hunt, in which in he also stars alongside Jung Woo-sung. The film had its world premiere at the 2022 Cannes Film Festival in May 2022. On February 26, 2022, Lee signed with Creative Artists Agency. On September 8, 2022, Lee was cast as the male lead in the Star Wars series The Acolyte, set to be released on Disney+. Lee received the Geumgwan Order of Cultural Merit from President Yoon Suk-yeol, which is the highest decoration awarded to those who have contributed to culture and arts.

Business ventures 
Apart from his acting, Lee is known for launching a chain of upscale Italian restaurants in Seoul named after his film Il Mare. Having studied interior design, he himself took responsibility for designing the interiors of his restaurants. Lee also founded the real estate development company Seorim C&D in 2008, and owns several businesses with actor Jung Woo-sung, a close friend whom he first worked with on the film City of the Rising Sun.

In May 2016, Lee and Jung established and became CEOs of their entertainment label called the "Artist Company".

Philanthropy 
On March 8, 2022, Lee donated  million to the Hope Bridge Disaster Relief Association along with Jung Woo-sung to help the victims of the massive wildfire that started in Uljin, Gyeongbuk and has spread to Samcheok, Gangwon.

On August 3, 2022, Hope Bridge Disaster Relief Association announced that Lee along with Jung Woo-sung joined the Hope Bridge Honors Club, a group of major donors with more than  million donations.

Personal life

In 1999, Lee was charged with driving under the influence (DUI) after colliding his BMW into a car in the adjacent lane. He was found to have a blood alcohol reading of 0.222%. As a result his driver's license was cancelled. Lee was also charged with a DUI in 2002 which also resulted in the cancellation of his drivers license.

In January 2015, Lee confirmed that he was dating , the former wife of Samsung's chairman Lee Jae-yong. Lee had previously dated Kim Min-hee.

Filmography

Film

Television series

Web series

Ambassadorship 
 Public Relations Ambassador 2030 Busan World Expo (2021)
 Ambassador for 2022 Seoul Fashion Week with Choi So-ra

Awards and nominations

References

External links 

 
 
 

1972 births
Living people
South Korean male film actors
South Korean male television actors
South Korean businesspeople
20th-century South Korean male actors
21st-century South Korean male actors
21st-century South Korean businesspeople
Dongguk University alumni
Best New Actor Paeksang Arts Award (film) winners
Best New Actor Paeksang Arts Award (television) winners
Best Supporting Actor Paeksang Arts Award (film) winners
Outstanding Performance by a Lead Actor in a Drama Series Primetime Emmy Award winners
South Korean male web series actors
South Korean male voice actors